Manizan (also Romanized as Mānīzān) is a village in Enaj Rural District, Qareh Chay District, Khondab County, Markazi Province, Iran. At the 2006 census, its population was 1,265, in 331 families.

References 

Populated places in Khondab County